Ilo, ILO or variations may refer to:

Places
Ilo Province, one of three provinces that make up the Moquegua Region in Peru
Ilo District
Ilo, Peru, a port in southern Peru
Lake Ilo, a man-made lake in Lake Ilo National Wildlife Refuge, North Dakota, United States

Organizations
iLo Technologies, a Walmart consumer electronics house brand
ILO-Motorenwerke, a former German manufacturer of two-stroke engines
International Labour Organization, a specialized agency of the United Nations that deals with labour issues
International Left Opposition, an opposition group within the Comintern

People
Dhimitër Ilo, one of the signatories of the Albanian Declaration of Independence
Miikka Ilo, Finnish footballer
Spiridon Ilo (1876-1950), one of the founding fathers of Albania
Ilo Wallace (1888-1981), wife of Henry A. Wallace, the 33rd Vice President of the United States

Other uses
Alternative name for the Ido constructed language
HP Integrated Lights-Out (iLO), the management processor used on most Hewlett-Packard ProLiant servers
Iloilo International Airport's IATA code
Initial license offering, (Ilo), revenue-based company funding utilizing technology sales
Injection-locked oscillator, a type of oscillator used in LC circuits
International Linguistics Olympiad, part of International Science Olympiads
ISO 639-2 and ISO 639-3 code for Ilokano language, spoken in the Philippines

See also
 Ylo (disambiguation)